Shaymuratovo (Şaymorat) is a rural locality (a selo) and the administrative centre of Shaymuratovsky Selsoviet, Karmaskalinsky District, Bashkortostan, Russia. The population was 776 as of 2010. There are 13 streets.

Geography 
Shaymuratovo is located 10 km west of Karmaskaly (the district's administrative centre) by road. Karmaskaly is the nearest rural locality.

References 

Rural localities in Karmaskalinsky District